Margos District is one of twelve districts of the province Huánuco in Peru.

Ethnic groups 
The people in the district are mainly indigenous citizens of Quechua descent. Quechua is the language which the majority of the population (70.88%) learnt to speak in childhood, 28.83% of the residents started speaking using the Spanish language (2007 Peru Census).

References